Sir Wymond Carew (by 1493–1549) was a sixteenth-century courtier and politician.

Carew was born by 1493, the son of John Carew of Antony in Cornwall. He was the treasurer of the household for Henry VIII's sixth wife, Catherine Parr. In December 1546, Carew was one of three commissioners, along with Sir John Gates and Sir Richard Southwell, sent to seize and inventory Kenninghall Palace, residence of Thomas Howard, third duke of Norfolk.

He was appointed Knight of the Order of the Bath in February 1547 and elected member of Parliament for Peterborough the same year.

He married Martha, the daughter of Sir Edmund Denny of Cheshunt, Hertfordshire. They had either 16 or 19 children, an unknown number of whom survived to adulthood, including Thomas. 

Sir Wymond was a brother-in-law of Sir Anthony Denny.

References

15th-century births
1549 deaths
People from Antony, Cornwall
Wymond
English MPs 1547–1552
Knights of the Bath